Jean Zaleski (born Jean Busuttil, also known as Jean Busuttil Zaleski; Birkirkara, Malta (April 11 1920 – May 2 2010) was a Maltese artist who spent most of her adult life in the United States. Her work has appeared in several exhibitions in the United States and Malta.

Biography
Jean Busuttil was born in Birkirkara, On April 11 1920)the youngest of 11 children. At the age of 8 she emigrated to the United States together with her family.

Education and awards
Zaleski studied as an artist in the United States at Philadelphia's Moore College of Art and Design, and in New York at the Pratt Institute, Parsons School of Design, and the Art Students League. In 1986 she received a Susan B Anthony Award in the field of painting from the National Organization for Women and was invited by President Jimmy Carter to the White House as part of a delegation of five women artists in 1975.

Works 
Painting by Zaleski have been presented in exhibitions during her life and after her death. 

Aside from art exhibitions, her work has also appeared in books. These publications fall into two categories: illustrations and artists' books, often combining both. These include  with poems by Edwin Honig, which consists of a strip formed from 2 joined sheets, folded accordion-style to form 22 pages on each side. This artists' book is designed in such a way that it can be viewed either as a regular two-page spread or as unfolded whole.

, edited by F. D. Reeve is illustrated with collage paintings by Zaleski.

References

Maltese artists
Maltese women
1920 births
2010 deaths
20th-century Maltese artists
21st-century Maltese artists
20th-century Maltese women
21st-century Maltese women
Maltese women artists
Maltese expatriates in the United States